Psylloidea is a superfamily of true bugs, including the jumping plant lice and others which have recently been classified as distinct families. Though the group first appeared during the Early Jurassic, modern members of the group do not appear until the Eocene, and Mesozoic members of the order are usually assigned to the possibly paraphyletic family Liadopsyllidae.

Families
 Aphalaridae
 Calophyidae
 Carsidaridae
 Homotomidae
 Liviidae
 Phacopteronidae
 Psyllidae
 Triozidae

In addition, the following extinct families are recognised:
 †Liadopsyllidae	
 †Malmopsyllidae	
 †Neopsylloididae

Gallery

References 

 
Hemiptera superfamilies
Sternorrhyncha